From There to Here: 1989-2002 is a compilation album by American singer Brian McKnight. It was released Motown Records on November 5, 2002 in the United States, following the release of his first two top-ten albums, 1999's Back at One and 2001's Superhero. This album covers McKnight's first six albums, with two new songs, "Let Me Love You" and "The Way I Do". Upon its release, it peaked at number 62 on the Billboard 200 and number 21 on the Top R&B/Hip-Hop Albums chart. Previously unrelease song "Let Me Love You" was the only single released from the compilation.

Critical reception

John Bush from AllMusic fund that a "the song selections are quite good, ably showing McKnight's technically perfect and artistically pleasing voice to good effect. What makes this a better compilation than ones on most other artists is the fact that Brian McKnight albums tended to have far too much filler to justify getting into the records on their own."

Track listing

Charts

References 

Brian McKnight albums
2002 albums